The Conasauga River is a river that runs through southeast Tennessee and northwest Georgia. The river is home to over 90 species of fish and 25 surviving species of freshwater mussels.

Location 
The Conasauga River is the most westerly trout water on public land in Georgia. It is the only river in Tennessee that is not a part of the Mississippi River watershed.

The only road access to the Conasauga is found via Old GA 2, GA 2, and Carlton Petty Road. Access via foot trail is located on Forest Service road (FS) 64 in Betty Gap. Three other trails descend from the west off FS 17 to intersect the river trail. From south to north they are the Chestnut Lead, Tearbritches Trail, and Hickory Creek Trail, . Primitive camping is allowed all along the river.

Natural information 
At the core of the Conasauga watershed is the  Cohutta Wilderness, located in Fannin, Gilmer, and Murray counties in Georgia and Polk County in Tennessee. The United States Forest Service manages the area as part of the Chattahoochee National Forest and Cherokee National Forest.

The Conasauga River is home to more than 90 fish species, including 10 federally listed species of fish and mussels.  Among these is the endemic, endangered Conasauga logperch (Percina jenkinsi).  Historically there were 42 species of freshwater mussels, however only 25 species still exist. It is estimated that only 1% of original population remains.  
The managed land is populated by white-tailed deer, wild hogs, black bears, and smaller animals.

Environmental problems

Up to one-third of the summer flow taken in the vicinity of Dalton, Georgia is used for carpet production.
The river has been contaminated with perfluorinated compounds used to make carpets stain-resistant.

Name
"Conasauga" is a name derived from the Cherokee language meaning "grass". According to the Geographic Names Information System, Conasauga River has also been known historically as:
 Connasauga River
 Connesauga River 
 Conne-san-ga River
 Slave River
 Jacks River now is the name of a tributary of the Conasauga.

See also
 Laurel Fork Railway
 List of rivers of Tennessee

References

External links

 The Conasauga River - The Nature Conservancy  no reference to Conasauga May 2016

Rivers of Georgia (U.S. state)
Rivers of Tennessee
Rivers of Fannin County, Georgia
Rivers of Gilmer County, Georgia
Rivers of Murray County, Georgia
Bodies of water of Polk County, Tennessee
Rivers of Whitfield County, Georgia
ACT River Basin